Odontarrhena is a large genus of flowering plants in the family Brassicaceae. They were originally a separate genus and then were amalgamated into the Alyssum genus, but then morphological and molecular evidence has reseperated them. Some of the genera are nickel (Ni) hyperaccumulators (a plant capable of growing in soil or water with very high concentrations of metals).

Description
It is similar in habit to Alyssum and has small yellow flowers, except that it has a suborbicular pouch and one seeded cells.
The plants are characterised by inflorescences that are usually compound, subumbellate racemes. There is a single ovule per loculus, and the fruit valves are at most only slightly inflated.

Range

Its widespread native range is from temperate Eurasia to subarctic America. It is found in Europe (within Albania, Bulgaria, Corsica, Crete, Czechoslovakia, East Aegean Islands, France, Greece, Hungary, Italy, Romania, Sardina, Sicily, Switzerland and Yugoslavia), Eastern Europe (within Central European Russia, Crimea, East European Russia, North European Russia, South European Russia and Ukraine), Siberia (within Altai, Buryatiya, Chita Oblast, Irkutsk Oblast, Krasnoyarsk Krai, Tuva, West Siberia and Yakutskiya), the Russian Far East (within Amur Oblast, Khabarovsk Krai and Magadan Oblast), Central Asia (within Kazakhstan and Turkmenistan), the Caucasus (North Caucasus and Transcaucasus), Western Asia (Afghanistan, Cyprus, Iran, Iraq, Lebanon, Palestine, Saudi Arabia, Syria and Turkey), China (Inner Mongolia, Manchuria and Xinjiang), Mongolia and also Subarctic America (within Alaska, Northwest Territories and the Yukon).

The Balkan Peninsula is a major diversity center. Greece has the largest number of species; next, Albania is known to have 7 species. It is also found on the serpentine soils of Lesbos Island (in Greece).

Taxonomy
Odontarrhena was a taxonomically difficult genus of the tribe Alysseae. However, recent morphological and molecular evidence (DNA analysis) clearly showed that Alyssum and Odontarrhena are monophyletic clades within the tribe Alysseae, deserving separate generic status (Warwick et al. 2008; Cecchi et al. 2010; Rešetnik et al. 2013; Li et al. 2015).

The genus name of Odontarrhena is derived from two Greek words; odous meaning tooth and arrhen meaning male.
It was first described and published by Carl Anton von Meyer in Flora Altaica (edited by Carl Friedrich von Ledebour) Vol.3 on page 58 in 1831.

The genus is recognized by the United States Department of Agriculture and the Agricultural Research Service, but they still list it as synonym of Alyssum  and they only list Odontarrhena obovata  as a known species.

Known species
The following list includes all species recognised by either Plants of the World Online (as of January 2022) or by BrassiBase (version 1.3, June 2020). Of these, 80 species are recognised by both databases, with the remaining 16 accepted by only one of them (this is indicated in each entry).
 Odontarrhena akamasica 
 Odontarrhena albiflora 
 Odontarrhena alpestris 
 Odontarrhena americana ; only in Plants of the World Online; in BrassiBase it is a synonym of Odontarrhena obovata
 Odontarrhena anatolica 
 Odontarrhena argentea 
 Odontarrhena baldaccii ; only in Plants of the World Online
 Odontarrhena bertolonii 
 Odontarrhena borzaeana ; accepted in BrassiBase; in Plants of the World Online it is a synonym of Odontarrhena obtusifolia
 Odontarrhena bracteata 
 Odontarrhena caliacrae ; only in Plants of the World Online; in BrassiBase it is a synonym of Odontarrhena tortuosa subsp. caliacrae
 Odontarrhena callichroa 
 Odontarrhena carica 
 Odontarrhena cassia 
 Odontarrhena chalcidica 
 Odontarrhena chondrogyna 
 Odontarrhena cilicica 
 Odontarrhena condensata 
 Odontarrhena constellata 
 Odontarrhena corsica 
 Odontarrhena corymbosoidea 
 Odontarrhena crenulata 
 Odontarrhena cyprica 
 Odontarrhena davisiana 
 Odontarrhena debarensis 
 Odontarrhena decipiens ; according to Plants of the World Online; on BrassiBase it is Odontarrhena lurensis
 Odontarrhena diffusa ; accepted in BrassiBase; in Plants of the World Online it is a synonym of Odontarrhena argentea
 Odontarrhena discolor 
 Odontarrhena dubertretii 
 Odontarrhena dudleyi 
 Odontarrhena elatior ; accepted in BrassiBase; in Plants of the World Online it is a synonym of Odontarrhena chalcidica
 Odontarrhena eriophylla 
 Odontarrhena euboea 
 Odontarrhena fallacina ; accepted in BrassiBase; in Plants of the World Online it is a synonym of Odontarrhena heldreichii
 Odontarrhena fedtschenkoana 
 Odontarrhena filiformis 
 Odontarrhena floribunda 
 Odontarrhena fragillima 
 Odontarrhena gehamensis 
 Odontarrhena gevgelicensis 
 Odontarrhena giosnana 
 Odontarrhena haradjianii 
 Odontarrhena haussknechtii 
 Odontarrhena heldreichii 
 Odontarrhena huber-morathii 
 Odontarrhena inflata 
 Odontarrhena kavadarcensis 
 Odontarrhena kurdica 
 Odontarrhena lanigera 
 Odontarrhena lesbiaca 
 Odontarrhena libanotica 
 Odontarrhena litvinovii 
 Odontarrhena lurensis ; according to BrassiBase; in Plants of the World Online it is Odontarrhena decipiens
 Odontarrhena markgrafii ; accepted in BrassiBase; in Plants of the World Online it is a synonym of Odontarrhena chalcidica
 Odontarrhena masmenaea 
 Odontarrhena metajnae 
 Odontarrhena moravensis ; only in Plants of the World Online
 Odontarrhena mozaffarianii ; only in Plants of the World Online
 Odontarrhena mughlaei 
 Odontarrhena muralis 
 Odontarrhena nebrodensis 
 Odontarrhena obovata 
 Odontarrhena obtusifolia 
 Odontarrhena orbelica 
 Odontarrhena oxycarpa 
 Odontarrhena pateri 
 Odontarrhena peltarioidea 
 Odontarrhena penjwinensis 
 Odontarrhena pinifolia 
 Odontarrhena polyclada 
 Odontarrhena pterocarpa 
 Odontarrhena pugiostyla 
 Odontarrhena rigida ; only in Plants of the World Online
 Odontarrhena robertiana 
 Odontarrhena samarifera 
 Odontarrhena samia 
 Odontarrhena schirwanica ; accepted in BrassiBase; in Plants of the World Online it is a synonym of Odontarrhena tortuosa subsp. tortuosa
 Odontarrhena serpentina 
 Odontarrhena serpentinicola 
 Odontarrhena serpyllifolia ; according to BrassiBase; in Plants of the World Online it is Alyssum serpyllifolium
 Odontarrhena sibirica 
 Odontarrhena singarensis 
 Odontarrhena skopjensis 
 Odontarrhena smolikana 
 Odontarrhena stipitata 
 Odontarrhena stridii ; only in Plants of the World Online
 Odontarrhena subalpina 
 Odontarrhena subspinosa 
 Odontarrhena syriaca 
 Odontarrhena szarabiaca 
 Odontarrhena tavolarae 
 Odontarrhena tortuosa 
 Odontarrhena trapeziformis 
 Odontarrhena troodi 
 Odontarrhena turgida 
 Odontarrhena virgata

Uses
About 48 members of the Odontarrhena species, are known to be nickel (Ni) hyperaccumulators (a plant capable of growing in soil or water with very high concentrations of metals). The accumulation of nickel was first discovered in the Italian endemic Odontarrhena bertolonii  (syn. Alyssum bertolonii  by Minguzzi and Vergnano in 1948, Of the 168 or so species of Alyssum, 45 species were determined to be hyperaccumulators of nickel, all from the Odontarrhena section. The metal is found in the roots, stem, leaves and flowers of the plant.

References

Other sources
 Cecchi, L., Colzi, I., Coppi, A., Gonnelli, C. & Selvi, F. (2013) Diversity and biogeography of Ni-hyperaccumulators of Alyssum section Odontarrhena (Brassicaceae) in the central western Mediterranean: evidence from karyology, morphology and DNA sequence data. Botanical journal of the Linnaean Society 173: 269–289.
 Nyárády, E.J. (1929a) [“1928”] Studiu preliminar asupra unor specii de Alyssum din secţia Odontarrhena. Vorstudium über einige Arten der Section Odontarrhena der Gattung Alyssum (Forsetzung). Buletinul Gradinii Botanice si al Muzeului Botanic dela Universitatea din Cluj 8 (2–4): 152–156.

Brassicaceae
Brassicaceae genera
Plants described in 1845
Flora of Czechoslovakia
Flora of Hungary
Flora of Switzerland
Flora of Corsica
Flora of France
Flora of Sardinia
Flora of Southeastern Europe
Flora of Eastern Europe
Flora of Siberia
Flora of the Russian Far East
Flora of Central Asia
Flora of the Caucasus
Flora of Western Asia
Flora of Saudi Arabia
Flora of Subarctic America